XHEW-TV was the television call sign for the local Once TV repeater in Matamoros, Tamaulipas, Mexico. It was owned by Patronato Cultural de Televisión de Matamoros, Tamps., A.C., which was in turn represented by José Julián Sacramento Garza, a one-time senator and federal deputy for Tamaulipas.

History
XHEW was authorized on January 22, 1991.

The station went dark by 1999 due to equipment failure; its permit was cancelled by Cofetel in 2007. Virtual channel 13 is now occupied by Imagen Televisión and its Reynosa-Matamoros transmitter, XHCTRM-TDT. Also, physical VHF channel 13 is now occupied by Weslaco's ABC affiliate KRGV-TV.

References

Television stations in Matamoros, Tamaulipas
Television channels and stations disestablished in 2007
Defunct television channels in Mexico
Television channels and stations established in 1991
1991 establishments in Mexico
2007 disestablishments in Mexico